Laima Andersone-Silāre (born 1929) is a Latvian opera singer.

References

1929 births
Living people
Musicians from Riga
20th-century Latvian opera singers